Natixis is a French corporate and investment bank created in November 2006 from the merger of the asset management and investment banking operations of Natexis Banques Populaires (Banque Populaire group) and IXIS (Groupe Caisse d'Epargne).

Natixis provides financial data for the 'Markets' section on the news channel, Euronews. On October 26, 2010, Natixis Investment Managers (NIM) has acquired a majority stake in asset management start-up ‘Ossiam’.

In February 2021, Groupe BPCE  made a tender offer for all Natixis shares it did not own. The offer completed in June 2021 and Natixis stock was delisted.

Operations 
 Corporate & Investment Banking Includes Capital Markets, Debt & Finance and Corporate & Institutional Banking. Capital Markets encompass equities, commodities, fixed-income, forex, derivatives and structured products.
 Asset Management Natixis Investment Managers is the 14th largest asset management firm in the world with $734 billion in assets under management as of September 30, 2012.

History
Natixis was created in November 2006 through the merger of the French investment banks Natexis and Ixis. These were the investment banks of the French savings banks, the Caisses d'Epargne (Ixis), and the cooperative Banques Populaires (Natexis). The German branch is based in Frankfurt.

It is headed by Philippe Dupont, chairman of the supervisory board and by Dominique Ferrero, who took over as general manager in 2006. In December 2006, the management team was known. 

In February 2021, it is announced Riahi's severance pay had been miscalculated, as he is asked to return 2.4 million euros.

Recognition

 Top Employer France 2019 certification

See also

 Lists of banks
 List of investors in Bernard L. Madoff Investment Securities

References

External links

Banks based in Paris
Banks established in 2006
Financial services companies established in 2006
French companies established in 2006
Companies based in Paris
Companies formerly listed on the Paris Bourse
French brands
2021 mergers and acquisitions
BPCE